Ruth Ewan is a Scottish artist based in Glasgow, who focuses on projects looking at social movements and protests.

Early life 
Ruth Ewan was born in Aberdeen, Scotland, in 1980. She studied fine art at the Edinburgh College of Art, graduating in 2002.

Exhibitions 
2006: Psittaciformes Trying to Change the World Studio Voltaire, London
2007: Ours is the world, despite all. Northern Gallery for Contemporary Art, Sunderland
2007: Did you kiss the foot that kicked you, Artangel London
2010: Damnatio Memoriae, Arthur Boskamp-Stiftung, Hohenlockstedt, Germany
2011: A Lock is a Gate, Art on the Underground, London
2011: Brank & Heckle, Dundee Contemporary Arts, Dundee
2012: Ruth Ewan, Kunsthall Charlottenborg, Copenhagen
2013: A Revolutionary Advent Calendar, MoMA, Warsaw

Projects

A Jukebox of People Trying to Change the World 
In 2003 Ewan began a project that is still ongoing to create an archive of songs that carry a message about changing the world. She used her own research, and that of other people. She invites participation from others, via a section on her own website. In April 2018, it was in the Yorkshire Sculpture Park, Bothy Gallery, where some songs included references to Donald Trump.

We Could Have Been Anything That We Wanted to Be 

Ewan created new clocks based on the French Republican Calendar which ran for 13 years from 5 October 1793. Each day was made up of 10 hours.  The work is made up of ten clocks, and was commissioned for Folkestone's Triennial in 2011.
There are two clocks which were made in addition to the initial ten, one red and one black. The red version is held by the Tate Britain, and the black by the Museum of Modern Art in Warsaw.

Sympathetic Magick 
In 2018, as part of the Edinburgh Art Festival, Ewan collaborated with magician Ian Saville to commission 16 political magicians to perform at various venues through the city.

Awards 

 2006: EASTinternational
 2008: Cocheme Fellowship, Byam Shaw School of Art
 2012: CREATE Art Award

See also
 Silent Agitator

References

External links 
 Ruth Ewan
 BBC Open Air

1980 births
Artists from Aberdeen
Scottish women artists
Living people